Berzu (also Romanized as Berzū) is a village in Safaiyeh Rural District, in the Central District of Zaveh County, Razavi Khorasan Province, Iran. At the 2006 census, its population was 599, in 115 families.

References 

Populated places in Zaveh County